Wow! (stylised in all caps) is the fourth studio album by English group Bananarama, released on 4 September 1987 by London Records. The album was entirely produced and co-written with the Stock Aitken Waterman production trio. Tensions between group member Siobhan Fahey and Stock, Aitken and Waterman regarding songwriting input and lyrical content (particularly with the track "Strike It Rich") prompted Fahey's departure from Bananarama five months after its release. 

The group's sound successfully shifted towards dance-oriented Europop under the direction of Pete Waterman, but the creative process on the project was often fraught, with Matt Aitken describing the band's contribution to song writing as minimal outside of suggesting song titles. Karen Hewitt, who was the engineer at the songwriting sessions made clear that Bananarama very much tried to be involved in the creative process but that this was not made easy by Mike and Matt who wanted to work very quickly. Bananarama were, however, very assertive and opinionated during the sessions.

By the time the album's fourth single, "I Want You Back", was released in March 1988, Fahey had been replaced with Jacquie O'Sullivan, who re-recorded the vocals for the single version of the song. Fahey would resurface later in 1988 with her new band, Shakespears Sister.

The album reached number 26 on the UK Albums Chart and number 44 on the US Billboard 200, while peaking at number one in Australia. The album was certified gold by the British Phonographic Industry (BPI) on 3 February 1988.

Wow! was reissued in 2013 as a three-disc deluxe edition, including "Reason for Living", which is an early version of "I Want You Back".

Track listing
All songs written by Sara Dallin, Siobhan Fahey, Keren Woodward, Mike Stock, Matt Aitken and Pete Waterman, except where noted.

LP version
"I Can't Help It" – 3:32
"I Heard a Rumour" – 3:25
"Some Girls" – 4:19
"Love in the First Degree" – 3:33
"Once in a Lifetime" – 4:05
"Strike It Rich" – 3:25
"Bad for Me" – 3:39
"Come Back" – 3:40  (Richard Feldman, Nick Trevisick) 
"Nathan Jones" – 5:12  (Kathy Wakefield, Leonard Caston) 
"I Want You Back" – 3:53

CD and cassette version
"I Can't Help It" – 3:32
"I Heard a Rumour" – 3:25
"Some Girls" (12" Version) – 5:47
"Love in the First Degree" – 3:33
"Once in a Lifetime" – 4:05
"Strike It Rich" (12" Version) – 6:01
"Bad for Me" – 3:39
"Come Back" – 3:40  (Richard Feldman, Nick Trevisick) 
"Nathan Jones" – 5:12  (Kathy Wakefield, Leonard Caston) 
"I Want You Back" – 3:53

Australian CD version (CDLIB5146)
"I Can't Help It" – 3:32
"I Heard a Rumour" – 3:25
"Some Girls" – 4:19
"Love in the First Degree" – 3:33
"Once in a Lifetime" – 4:05
"Strike It Rich" – 3:25
"Bad for Me" – 3:39
"Come Back" – 3:40  (Richard Feldman, Nick Trevisick) 
"Nathan Jones" – 5:12  (Kathy Wakefield, Leonard Caston) 
"I Want You Back" – 3:47 (Single Mix, unreferenced with no mention to O'Sullivan)
"Some Girls" (12" Version) – 5:47
"Strike It Rich" (12" Version) – 6:01
"The Bananarama Mega-Mix" – 7:31

Limited double vinyl edition
"I Can't Help It" – 3:32
"I Heard a Rumour" – 3:25
"Some Girls" – 4:19
"Love in the First Degree" – 3:33
"Once in a Lifetime" – 4:05
"Strike It Rich" – 3:25
"Bad for Me" – 3:39
"Come Back" – 3:40  (Richard Feldman, Nick Trevisick) 
"Nathan Jones" – 5:12  (Kathy Wakefield, Leonard Caston) 
"I Want You Back" – 3:53
"The Bananarama Mega-Mix" – 7:26
"Mr. Sleaze" (Rare Groove Remix)
"Ecstasy" (Wild Style) – 5:37

2007 CD re-issue plus bonus tracks
"I Can't Help It" – 3:32
"I Heard a Rumour" – 3:25
"Some Girls" – 4:21
"Love in the First Degree" – 3:33
"Once in a Lifetime" – 4:05
"Strike it Rich" – 2:18
"Bad for Me" – 3:39
"Come Back" – 3:40  (Richard Belman, Nick Trevisick) 
"Nathan Jones" – 5:12  (Kathy Wakefield, Leonard Caston) 
"I Want You Back" – 3:53
"Clean Cut Boy" (Party Size) – 4:39  (Sara Dallin, Siobhan Fahey, Keren Woodward, Ian Curnow) 
"Mr. Sleaze" – 4:44
"Ecstasy" (Wild Style) – 5:37
"Nathan Jones" (Psycho 7-inch edit) – 3:03  (Kathy Wakefield, Leonard Caston) 
"I Want You Back" (Single Version) – 3:47
"Amnesia" (Theme from The Roxy) – 6:28  (Mike Stock, Matt Aitken, Pete Waterman) 
"Nathan Jones" (Single Version) – 3:18  (Kathy Wakefield, Leonard Caston) 

2013 Deluxe Edition 2CD/DVD re-issue

Disc 1

"I Can't Help It" – 3:32
"I Heard a Rumour" – 3:25
"Some Girls" – 4:19
"Love in the First Degree" – 3:33
"Once in a Lifetime" – 4:05
"Strike It Rich" – 3:25
"Bad for Me" – 3:39
"Come Back" – 3:40  (Richard Belman, Nick Trevisick) 
"Nathan Jones (Bass Tone Mix)" – 5:34  (Kathy Wakefield, Leonard Caston) 
"I Want You Back" – 3:53
"Clean Cut Boy [Party Size]" - 4.43
"Mr Sleaze" - 4.49
"Ecstasy" - 4.11
"Amnesia" [12” Extended Version] - 6.26
"I Heard a Rumour" [Horoscope Mix] - 5.57
"Love in the First Degree" [Jailers Mix With Intro] - 6.19
"I Can't Help It" [Extended Club Mix] - 8.03

Disc 2

"Love in the First Degree" [Love In The House Mix] - 8.33
"I Heard a Rumour" [House Mix] - 7.22
"I Can't Help It" [The Hammond Version Excursion] - 6.33
"Reason for Living" [12" Master] - 6.08
"Some Girls" [12” Version] - 5.46
"Strike It Rich" [12” Version] - 5.59
"I Heard a Rumour" [Original 12" Mix] - 7.06
"Nathan Jones" [Original 12” Mix] - 5.45
"I Want You Back" [Original 12” Mix] - 7.18
"Ecstasy" [Chicago House Stylee] - 5.57
"I Heard a Rumour" [Dub] - 5.18
"Mr Sleaze" [Rare Groove Remix] - 6.02

DVD

"I Heard a Rumour"
"Love in the First Degree"
"Mr Sleaze"
"I Can't Help It"
"I Want You Back"
"Love, Truth and Honesty"
"Nathan Jones"
"Help!"
"I Can't Help It" [12” Version]
"I Want You Back" [Alternative Version]
"I Heard a Rumour" [On 'Top Of The Pops']
"I Want You Back" [On 'Going Live']
"Love, Truth and Honesty" [On 'Top Of The Pops']
"Nathan Jones" [On 'Wogan']

Notes on "Some Girls" and "Strike It Rich"

The original LP release of the album included album versions of both songs (respectively 4:19 and 3:25).
The original CD included 12-inch versions (respectively 5:47 and 6:00).
The 2007 re-issue of Wow! contains the album version of "Some Girls" and contains the shortened faded version of "Strike it Rich" (12" Version) from the "Love, Truth & Honesty – The Remixes" 12" Single – 2:18.

Personnel
Bananarama
Sara Dallin – vocals
Siobhan Fahey – vocals
Keren Woodward – vocals

Musicians
Mike Stock  – keyboards and Linn programmes
Matt Aitken – guitar, keyboards and Linn programmes
John O'Hara – keyboards
A. Linn – drums
Pete Waterman – additional drum patterns
Ian Curnow – Fairlight programming
Technical
Pete Hammond – mixer
Phil Harding – assistant mixer
Mark McGuire - engineer
Burni Adams - tape operator
Freddy Bastone – mixer on "Nathan Jones"

Additional personnel
Hillary Shaw – manager
Peter Barrett – sleeve design
Andrew Biscomb – sleeve design
Andy Earl – photography
Carrie Branovan – additional photography
Herb Ritts - Gatefold sleeve photography

Charts

Weekly charts

Year-end chart

Certifications

References

1987 albums
Albums produced by Stock Aitken Waterman
Bananarama albums
London Records albums